Matson Lawson (born 6 May 1992) is an Australian competitive swimmer. He competed in the 200-metre backstroke at the 2012 Summer Olympics in London, finishing 15th.  He won a bronze medal in the 200-metre backstroke at the 2014 Commonwealth Games.

References

External links
 
 

1992 births
Living people
Australian male backstroke swimmers
Swimmers at the 2012 Summer Olympics
Olympic swimmers of Australia
Swimmers at the 2014 Commonwealth Games
Commonwealth Games bronze medallists for Australia
Commonwealth Games medallists in swimming
21st-century Australian people
People from Carlton, Victoria
Swimmers from Melbourne
Sportsmen from Victoria (Australia)
Medallists at the 2014 Commonwealth Games